Fairfield is a township in far northwestern Essex County, in the U.S. state of New Jersey. As of the 2020 United States census, the township's population was 7,872, an increase of 406 (+5.4%) from the 2010 census count of 7,466, which in turn reflected an increase of 403 (+5.7%) from the 7,063 counted at the 2000 census. Fairfield was the least densely populated town in Essex County in 2010.

The first Europeans to settle in the area were Dutch and the place was called Gansegat. Later it was part of Horse Neck and officially part of Newark Township. What is now Fairfield was formed on February 16, 1798, as Caldwell Township from portions of Acquackanonk Township and Newark Township. The area was named for Rev. James Caldwell. It was incorporated as one of New Jersey's initial 104 townships by an act of the New Jersey Legislature on February 21, 1798. Portions of the township were taken to create Livingston (February 8, 1813), Fairmount Township (March 11, 1862, now part of West Orange), Caldwell borough (February 10, 1892), Verona Township (February 17, 1892, now known and including what is now Cedar Grove), North Caldwell (March 31, 1898), Essex Fells (March 31, 1902) and West Caldwell (February 24, 1904). On November 6, 1963, Caldwell Township was renamed as Fairfield Township, based on the results of a referendum passed the previous day. Fairfield was reincorporated as borough on June 8, 1964. In 1978, the borough passed a referendum reincorporating itself as a township, becoming the second of more than a dozen Essex County municipalities to reclassify themselves as townships in order take advantage of federal revenue sharing policies that allocated townships a greater share of government aid to municipalities on a per capita basis.

History
The Dutch, including many acculturated French Huguenots, initially settled this area of the Passaic River Valley after purchasing it from the Native Americans. They named it "Gansegat" which is Dutch for "duck's pond".

The Horseneck Tract was an  area that consisted of what are now the municipalities of Fairfield, Caldwell, West Caldwell, North Caldwell, Verona, Cedar Grove, Essex Fells, Roseland, and portions of Livingston and West Orange. Later in 1702, English settlers purchased  of the Horseneck Tract without approval of the Proprietary Authorities from the Lenape Native Americans for goods equal to $325. When Proprietary Authorities began eviction proceedings against the settlers, the Horseneck Riots took place. This purchase encompassed much of western Essex County, from the First Mountain to a point on the Passaic River at Pine Brook NJ. The reason for the Horseneck name has never been determined, but historians agree that it is not because of its shape.

The Van Ness House, constructed about 1720, is a historic home added in 1977 to the National Register of Historic Places. The Fairfield Dutch Reformed Church dates back to 1720, and its current structure is another historic site, built in 1804.

Geography
According to the United States Census Bureau, the township had a total area of 10.35 square miles (26.80 km2), including 10.13 square miles (26.23 km2) of land and 0.22 square miles (0.57 km2) of water (2.14%). Fairfield has the lowest population density of any municipality in Essex County. Fairfield Township is located in the northwest corner of Essex County. The township is bisected by Interstate 80 and Route 46.

Unincorporated communities, localities and place names located partially or completely within the township include Clinton and Clinton Park.

Great Piece Meadows is a swamp covering .

The township borders North Caldwell and West Caldwell in Essex County; East Hanover Township, Lincoln Park and Montville in Morris County; and Little Falls and Wayne in Passaic County.

Demographics

2010 census

The Census Bureau's 2006–2010 American Community Survey showed that (in 2010 inflation-adjusted dollars) median household income was $97,361 (with a margin of error of +/− $11,797) and the median family income was $117,004 (+/− $7,881). Males had a median income of $69,081 (+/− $15,627) versus $51,198 (+/− $6,668) for females. The per capita income for the borough was $41,615 (+/− $5,217). About 0.5% of families and 2.8% of the population were below the poverty line, including none of those under age 18 and 6.8% of those age 65 or over.

2000 census
As of the 2000 United States census there were 7,063 people, 2,296 households, and 1,981 families residing in the township. The population density was 675.8 people per square mile (261.0/km2). There were 2,326 housing units at an average density of 222.5 per square mile (85.9/km2). The racial makeup of the township was 95.63% White, 0.52% African American, 0.10% Native American, 2.82% Asian, 0.40% from other races, and 0.54% from two or more races. Hispanic or Latino of any race were 3.45% of the population.

There were 2,296 households, out of which 33.4% had children under the age of 18 living with them, 74.7% were married couples living together, 8.3% had a female householder with no husband present, and 13.7% were non-families. 10.9% of all households were made up of individuals, and 6.0% had someone living alone who was 65 years of age or older. The average household size was 3.04 and the average family size was 3.29.

In the township the population was spread out, with 22.0% under the age of 18, 7.0% from 18 to 24, 27.8% from 25 to 44, 28.1% from 45 to 64, and 15.1% who were 65 years of age or older. The median age was 41 years. For every 100 females, there were 95.7 males. For every 100 females age 18 and over, there were 93.3 males.

The median income for a household in the township was $83,120, and the median income for a family was $90,998. Males had a median income of $56,106 versus $39,032 for females. The per capita income for the township was $32,099. About 2.3% of families and 2.8% of the population were below the poverty line, including 4.2% of those under age 18 and 2.2% of those age 65 or over.

Economy
Corporate residents of Fairfield Township include:
 Pharmaceutical firm Bradley Pharmaceuticals was headquartered here until the company was acquired by Nycomed in 2008.
 Cricket Hill, microbrewer of American Ale, Hopnotic IPA, and East Coast Lager.
 Telebrands, the direct marketing firm best known for its "As Seen on TV" products.

Government
Fairfield Township operates within the Faulkner Act, formally known as the Optional Municipal Charter Law, under the Small Municipality plan C form of New Jersey government, as implemented as of January 1, 1962, based on direct petition. The township is one of 18 municipalities (of the 564) statewide that use this form of government, which is available to municipalities with less than 12,000 residents at the time of adoption. The governing body is comprised of the Mayor and the four-member Township Council. Members are elected at-large in partisan elections in a three-year cycle, with two council seats up for vote in each of the first two years of the cycle and the mayoral seat up in the third year. The Mayor exercises executive power of the municipality, appoints department heads with Council approval, prepares the annual budget and has veto over ordinances subject to override by 2/3 of all members of Council. The Council exercises legislative power of municipality and approves appointment of department heads.

, members of the Fairfield Township Council are Mayor William Galese (R, appointed to serve an unexpired term ending December 31, 2024), Council President Michael B. McGlynn (R, 2025), Peter Campisi (R, 2023; appointed to serve an unexpired term), Joseph Cifelli (R, 2025) and John LaForgia (R, 2023).

In January 2023, councilmember William Galese was appointed as mayor to fill the seat expiring in December 2024 that had been held by James Gasparini until he resigned to take office as the township's administrator. Later that month, Peter Campisi was appointed to fill Galese's vacant council seat expiring in December 2023.

Federal, state and county representation
Fairfield is located in the 11th Congressional District and is part of New Jersey's 26th state legislative district. Prior to the 2011 reapportionment following the 2010 Census, Fairfield had been in the 27th state legislative district.

Politics
As of March 2011, there were a total of 5,378 registered voters in Fairfield, of which 1,004 (18.7%) were registered as Democrats, 2,072 (38.5%) were registered as Republicans and 2,299 (42.7%) were registered as Unaffiliated. There were 3 voters registered as Libertarians or Greens.

In the 2016 presidential election, Republican Donald Trump received 72.5% of the vote (2,858 cast), ahead of Democrat Hillary Clinton with 25.6% (1,009 cast), and other candidates with 1.8% (70 votes), among the 4,003 ballots cast by the township's 5,798 registered voters, for a turnout of 69%. In the 2012 presidential election, Republican Mitt Romney received 69.4% of the vote (2,494 cast), ahead of Democrat Barack Obama with 29.7% (1,069 votes), and other candidates with 0.9% (32 votes), among the 3,625 ballots cast by the township's 5,459 registered voters (30 ballots were spoiled), for a turnout of 66.4%. In the 2008 presidential election, Republican John McCain received 70.1% of the vote (2,797 cast), ahead of Democrat Barack Obama with 28.5% (1,137 votes) and other candidates with 0.5% (21 votes), among the 3,991 ballots cast by the township's 5,380 registered voters, for a turnout of 74.2%. In the 2004 presidential election, Republican George W. Bush received 69.6% of the vote (2,742 ballots cast), outpolling Democrat John Kerry with 29.2% (1,151 votes) and other candidates with 0.8% (39 votes), among the 3,939 ballots cast by the township's 5,131 registered voters, for a turnout percentage of 76.8.

In the 2013 gubernatorial election, Republican Chris Christie received 73.9% of the vote (1,600 cast), ahead of Democrat Barbara Buono with 25.3% (548 votes), and other candidates with 0.8% (17 votes), among the 2,193 ballots cast by the township's 5,445 registered voters (28 ballots were spoiled), for a turnout of 40.3%. In the 2009 gubernatorial election, Republican Chris Christie received 68.9% of the vote (1,819 ballots cast), ahead of  Democrat Jon Corzine with 25.0% (661 votes), Independent Chris Daggett with 5.0% (133 votes) and other candidates with 0.5% (12 votes), among the 2,641 ballots cast by the township's 5,397 registered voters, yielding a 48.9% turnout.

Education
The Fairfield School District serves public school students in pre-kindergarten through sixth grade. As of the 2018–19 school year, the district, comprised of two schools, had an enrollment of 669 students and 63.6 classroom teachers (on an FTE basis), for a student–teacher ratio of 10.5:1. Schools in the district (with 2018–19 enrollment data from the National Center for Education Statistics) are 
Adlai E. Stevenson Elementary School with 402 students in Pre-Kindergarten through third grade and 
Winston S. Churchill School with 268 students in fourth through sixth grade.

Students in public school for seventh through twelfth grades attend the West Essex Regional School District, a regional school district in western Essex County serving students from Essex Fells, Fairfield, North Caldwell and Roseland. Schools in the district (with 2018–19 enrollment data from the National Center for Education Statistics) are 
West Essex Middle School with 564 students in grades 7–8 and 
West Essex High School with 1,123 students in grades 9–12. Seats on the nine-member board of education of the high school district are allocated based on population, with three seats assigned to Fairfield.

StenoTech Career Institute is a technical school in Fairfield, established in 1988, that offers court reporting and medical transcription training.

Transportation

Roads and highways

U.S. Route 46, Route 159 and Interstate 80 all pass through the Township.

Public transportation
NJ Transit provides bus service to Newark on the 29 and 71 routes.

Lakeland Bus Lines offers service to and from the Port Authority Bus Terminal in Midtown Manhattan on its Route 46 route.

Essex County Airport, managed by the Essex County Improvement Authority, is located in Fairfield.

Notable people

People who were born in, residents of, or otherwise closely associated with Fairfield include:

 Robert Egan (born 1958, class of 1976), restaurateur and an interlocutor between the government of the Democratic People's Republic of Korea (North Korea) and the United States
 David Greczek (born 1994), professional soccer player who plays as a goalkeeper, most recently for Swope Park Rangers in the United Soccer League
 Gurbir Grewal (born 1973), Attorney General of New Jersey
 John LoCascio (born 1991), defenseman for the Rochester Rattlers in Major League Lacrosse
 James F. Post (1818–1899), architect, builder, and contractor who designed and oversaw the construction of over 60 buildings, best known for his buildings in Wilmington, North Carolina
 Jake Siciliano (born 1998), actor
 Michelle Vizzuso (born 1977), field hockey player recognized by The Star-Ledger as the sport's top athlete of the 20th century

References

External links

 Fairfield Township website
 Fairfield School District
 
 School Data for the Fairfield School District, National Center for Education Statistics
 West Essex Regional School District
 
 School Data for the West Essex Regional School District, National Center for Education Statistics
 Historical articles, bibliography, and chronology see :     07004 History

 
1798 establishments in New Jersey
Faulkner Act (small municipality)
Populated places established in 1798
Townships in Essex County, New Jersey